CHTC-FM is a radio station that broadcasts on a frequency 99.9 FM in Tsiigehtchic, Northwest Territories, Canada.

The station is owned by James Cardinal.

External links

Htc